Hemimyzon formosanus is a species of hillstream loach (a ray-finned fish) in the genus Hemimyzon. It is endemic to western portion of Central Mountain Range of Taiwan. Variations in nucleotide sequences within the mitochondrial control region show strong geographic structuring suggestive of a cryptic species complex.

Sources

Hemimyzon
Endemic fauna of Taiwan
Freshwater fish of Taiwan
Fish described in 1894